The Consortium of Higher Education LGBT Resource Professionals, which was founded as the National Consortium of Directors of LGBT Resources in Higher Education, originated in 1997 at the San Diego NGLTF Creating Change Conference. In 2008 they changed their name to better reflect their membership and mission. 

The organization is dedicated to improving the educational environment for students, faculty, staff, administrators, and alumni and ensuring that lesbian, gay, bisexual, and transgender participants have equity in every respect. The consortium works with LGBT student centers to provide support, resources and help with the development of curriculum. The number of student centers with which they worked increased from 36 in 1994 to 75 in 2000 to 175 in 2011 and 200 by 2013.
 
The Consortium's mission is to "achieve higher education environments in which lesbian, gay, bisexual, and transgender students, faculty, staff, administrators, and alumni have equity in every respect." whose goals are to "support colleagues and develop curriculum to professionally enhance this work; to seek climate improvement on campuses; and to advocate for policy change, program development, and establishment of LGBT Office/Centers."

See also

LGBT rights in the United States
List of LGBT-related organizations

References

External links
Official website

Organizations established in 1997
LGBT political advocacy groups in the United States
Education-related professional associations
LGBT and education